The Treaty of Kalisz was signed in Kalisz on 28 February 1813, between Russia and Prussia against Napoleon I. It marked the final changeover of Prussia onto the side against Napoleon.

The events that led to this alliance date back to 30 December 1812, at Tauroggen when Lieutenant-General Ludwig Yorck von Wartenburg, on behalf of his Prussian troops, and General Hans Karl von Diebitsch of the Russian Army signed the Convention of Tauroggen. The Convention of Tauroggen armistice, signed by Diebitsch and Yorck, "neutralised" the Prussian corps without consent of their king. The news was received with the wildest enthusiasm in Prussia, but the Prussian Court dared not throw off the mask yet, and an order was dispatched suspending Yorck from his command pending a court-martial. Two months later, the Prussians officially switched sides when Prussia and Russia signed the treaty and agreed to establish an alliance against Napoleon known as the Kalisz Union.

The treaty is also an interesting example of the predominance of the French language at this time. The text of the treaty was written in French, even though it was intended to arrange hostilities against France.

See also
War of the Sixth Coalition
Convention of Tauroggen
List of treaties
Treaty of Kalisz (1343)

References

Further reading
 J. P. Riley. Napoleon and the World War of 1813: Lessons in Coalition Warfighting (2000)

External links
The Columbia Encyclopedia: Kalisz

Kalisz
1813 treaties
Kalisz (1813)
19th-century military alliances
Kalisz (1813)
Military alliances involving Prussia
Military alliances involving Russia
1813 in Prussia
1813 in the Russian Empire
Prussia–Russia relations
February 1813 events
Bilateral treaties of Russia